Pseudapocryptes is a genus of gobies native to fresh and brackish waters of the Indian Ocean and Pacific Ocean coasts from India to Tahiti.

Species
There are currently two recognized species in this genus:
 Pseudapocryptes borneensis (Bleeker, 1855)
 Pseudapocryptes elongatus (G. Cuvier, 1816)

References

Oxudercinae